Yuan may refer to:

Currency
 Yuan (currency), the basic unit of currency in historic and contemporary mainland China and Taiwan
Renminbi, the current currency used in mainland China, whose basic unit is yuan
 New Taiwan dollar, the current currency used in Taiwan, whose basic unit is yuán in Mandarin
 Manchukuo yuan, the unit of currency that was used in the Japanese puppet state of Manchukuo

Governmental organ
 "Government branch" or "Court", the Chinese name for a kind of executive institution.

Government of Taiwan
 Control Yuan
 Examination Yuan
 Executive Yuan
 Judicial Yuan
 Legislative Yuan

Government of Imperial China
 Xuanzheng Yuan, or Bureau of Buddhist and Tibetan Affairs during the Yuan dynasty
 Lifan Yuan during the Qing dynasty

Dynasties
 Yuan dynasty (元朝), a dynasty of China ruled by the Mongol Borjigin clan
 Northern Yuan dynasty (北元), the Yuan dynasty's successor state in northern China and the Mongolian Plateau

People and languages
 Yuan (surname), the transliteration of a number of Chinese family names (e.g. 袁, 元, 苑, 原, 源, 爰, 遠)
 Yuan Haowen (元好問; 1190–1257), Chinese poet, author, and official
 Thai Yuan, a people of Northern Thailand
 Yuan language, commonly known as Northern Thai language, language of the Thai Yuan people

Places
 Yu'an District, in Anhui, China
 Yuan River (沅江 or 沅水), one of the four largest rivers in Hunan, a tributary of the Yangtze River

Other uses
 Yuanfen (缘分), a Chinese or Buddhist concept that means the predetermined principle that dictates a person's relationships and encounters
 Type 041 submarine, PLAN Yuan-class submarines
 Yuan Qi (TCM), in traditional Chinese medicine
 Yuan (Tales of Symphonia) (ユアン), a character from Tales of Symphonia 
 BYD Yuan (元), a car
 Tao Yúan (Shaman King) (Tao En), a character in Shaman King

See also 
 圓 (disambiguation), the character where Yuan comes from
 Yen, the currency of Japan
 Korean won, the currency of Korea